Kevin McLeod or MacLeod may refer to:

Sports
 Kevin McLeod (footballer, born 1980), English footballer
 Kevin McLeod (Australian footballer) (born 1949), Australian footballer for Footscray
 Kevin McLeod (American football) (born 1974), football player

Others
 Kevin MacLeod (born 1972), American musician and soundtrack composer
 Kevin S. MacLeod (born 1951), Canadian Secretary to the Queen of Canada
 Kevin McLeod, member of Scottish folk music groups The Singing Kettle and Funbox

See also 
 Kevin McCloud (born 1959), British designer, writer and television presenter